Kangarban-e Vosta (also Romanized as Kangarbān-e Vosţá and Kangarbān-e Vasaţī; also known as Fāntāwār, Kangarbān, and Kangarbān-e Vasaţ) is a village in Chaqa Narges Rural District, Mahidasht District, Kermanshah County, Kermanshah Province, Iran. At the 2006 census, its population was 24, in 6 families.

References 

Populated places in Kermanshah County